The Fifteenth Street and Oklahoma Avenue Brick Street is a  section of brick pavement on Fifteenth Street and Oklahoma Avenue in Mattoon, Illinois. The section of pavement covers eight blocks of Fifteenth Street and one block of Oklahoma Avenue at the south end of the Fifteenth Street section. The H. W. Clark Company paved the streets in 1924. The company first laid a concrete substructure and concrete curbs. An intermediate layer of sand and tar was laid on top of the concrete, and the bricks were placed on top of this layer. The segment of brick street accounts for nearly all of Mattoon's remaining brick streets, as less than 20% of its original  brick street system has not been paved over with asphalt.

The street was added to the National Register of Historic Places on November 22, 1999.

References

Roads on the National Register of Historic Places in Illinois
National Register of Historic Places in Coles County, Illinois